Detroit Edison Co v NLRB, 440 US 301 (1979) is a US labor law case, concerning the right to organize.

Facts
The union claimed that it had the right, for collective bargaining, to information about the employer’s testing program. It had a test battery the employer used, and scores of individual employees. There was a grievance over whether an employer breached a seniority clause in a collective agreement, hiring outside instead of internal promotions.

Judgment
The Supreme Court, 5 to 4, struck down the National Labor Relations Board order giving the union the access to data. Providing individual test scores went too far, and should only be available with individual employee consent.

Stevens, White, Brennan, Marshall J dissented.

See also

US labor law

Notes

References

United States labor case law